Vonnie Gros (born c. 1936) is a former American field hockey player and coach. She attended Ursinus College where she was captain of the field hockey team. She later coached the field hockey teams at West Chester and Princeton. She also served as the head coach of the U.S. national team for several years and of the U.S. Olympic team at the 1980 (boycotted) and 1984 Summer Olympics (bronze medal). In 1988, she became one of the charter inductees into the USA Field Hockey Hall of Fame.

References

American female field hockey players
Ursinus College alumni